Monroe County is a county in the state of Florida. As of the 2020 census, the population was 82,874. Its county seat is Key West. Monroe County includes the islands of the Florida Keys and comprises the Key West Micropolitan Statistical Area. Over 99.9% of the county's population lives on the Florida Keys. The mainland, which is part of the Everglades, comprises 87% of the county's land area and is virtually uninhabited with only 17 people in total.

History

Monroe County was created in 1823. It was named for James Monroe, the fifth president of the United States from 1817 to 1825.

Geography
It is the largest county in Florida by total area.

More than 99.9 percent of the Monroe County population lives in the island chain known as the Florida Keys.

Two thirds of the large area in what local residents call "mainland Monroe" is uninhabited by virtue of being part of the Everglades National Park, and the remainder by the Big Cypress National Preserve in the northeastern interior. The area, officially named Cape Sable Census County Division, is virtually uninhabited. This area has 87.4 percent of the county's land area (859.6 out of ), but it had only 0.022 percent of the county's population (18 out of 82,170) as of the 2021 American Community Survey. The Census Bureau defines this area as Census Tract 9800 of Monroe County, Florida. If it were a separate county, its population density of only 0.0209 sq mi (0.0541 km2) would make it the least dense of all US counties or county-equivalents.

In mainland Monroe, the only three populated places appearing on detailed maps and in the USGS geographic name database are Flamingo, Pinecrest, (not to be confused with much larger Pinecrest of neighboring Miami-Dade County), and Trail City. Flamingo, on the south coast and at the end of State Road 9336 (Flamingo Lodge Highway), is the location of the Flamingo Lodge and the Flamingo Ranger Station (with Visitor Center & Marina).  northeast on the highway is the West Lake Trail (station). Pinecrest, located in the northern interior of the county (in the Big Cypress National Preserve) on Loop Road (given that name since it forms a loop with U.S. Highway 41 further north), hosts the Loop Road Education Center. Loop Road can be found on most maps as CR 94, although the roadway no longer has a numbered designation and is now managed by the National Park Service.

Between the south coast of Florida's mainland and the Florida Keys is Florida Bay, which is encompassed by the Everglades National Park and contains numerous islets or keys.

Adjacent counties
 Collier County – north (on mainland)
 Miami-Dade County – east (on mainland) and north (over water)

Protected areas

 Bahia Honda State Park
 Big Cypress National Preserve
 Crocodile Lake National Wildlife Refuge
 Curry Hammock State Park
 Dagny Johnson Key Largo Hammock Botanical State Park
 Dry Tortugas National Park
 Everglades National Park
 Fort Zachary Taylor Historic State Park
 Great White Heron National Wildlife Refuge
 Indian Key State Historic Site
 John Pennekamp Coral Reef State Park
 Key West National Wildlife Refuge
 Lignumvitae Key Botanical State Park
 Long Key State Park
 National Key Deer Refuge
 San Pedro Underwater Archaeological Preserve State Park
 Windley Key Fossil Reef Geological State Park

Demographics

2020 census

As of the 2020 United States census, there were 82,874 people, 32,839 households, and 18,586 families residing in the county.

2010 census
As of the census of 2010, there were 73,090 people, 32,629 households, and 18,219 families living in the county. The racial makeup of the county was 89.5% White (71.3% Non-Hispanic White), 5.7% Black or African American, 0.4% Native American, 1.1% Asian, 0.1% Pacific Islander, 1.4% from other races, and 1.8% from two or more races. 20.6% of the population were Hispanic or Latino of any race.

2000 census
As of the census of 2000, there were 79,589 people, 35,086 households, and 20,384 families living in the county. The population density was 80 people per square mile (31/km2). There were 51,617 housing units at an average density of 52 per square mile (20/km2). The racial makeup of the county was 90.65% White, 4.77% Black or African American, 0.38% Native American, 0.83% Asian, 0.04% Pacific Islander, 1.55% from other races, and 1.78% from two or more races. 15.77% of the population were Hispanic or Latino of any race.

In 2005 Monroe County had a population that was 75.1% non-Hispanic white, 17.7% Latino, 5.4% African-American and 1.1% Asian.

In 2000 there were 35,086 households, out of which 20.80% had children under the age of 18 living with them, 46.80% were married couples living together, 7.30% had a female householder with no husband present, and 41.90% were non-families. 28.80% of all households were made up of individuals, and 8.20% had someone living alone who was 65 years of age or older. The average household size was 2.23 and the average family size was 2.73.

In the county, the population was spread out, with 17.10% under the age of 18, 6.30% from 18 to 24, 31.10% from 25 to 44, 30.90% from 45 to 64, and 14.60% who were 65 years of age or older. The median age was 43 years. For every 100 females there were 113.90 males. For every 100 females age 18 and over, there were 114.80 males.

The median income for a household in the county was $42,283, and the median income for a family was $50,734. Males had a median income of $31,266 versus $25,709 for females. The per capita income for the county was $26,102. About 6.80% of families and 10.20% of the population were below the poverty line, including 11.80% of those under age 18 and 8.80% of those age 65 or over.

Languages
As of 2010, 77.57% spoke English as a first language, and 17.56% spoke Spanish, 0.96% spoke French Creole (mainly Haitian Creole), 0.74% spoke French, and 0.50% spoke Russian as their primary language. In total, 22.43% of the population spoke a main language other than English.

Transportation

Airports
 Key West International Airport
 Florida Keys Marathon Airport

Major highways

Culture

Monroe County cultural organizations include the Key West Literary Seminar, The Studios of Key West, the Red Barn Theatre, Key West Symphony, Sculpture Key West, Fantasy Fest, the San Carlos Institute, Hemingway House and Museum, Customs House Museum, and Key West Art and Historical Society.

The Florida Keys Council for the Arts is the primary cultural umbrella for the Florida Keys, and serves the population from Key Largo to Key West. A non-profit local arts agency, it makes grants, operates the Monroe County Art in Public Places program, sponsors seminars, and manages the on-line cultural calendar for the region. It also manages the county's Tourism Development Council arts marketing grants and serves as a leading advocate for cultural tourism in lower Florida. In 1998, the Florida Keys Council of the Arts was designated by the Board of Monroe County Commissioners as the area's Local Arts Agency as provided by Florida Statute 286.011. Established in 1997 as the Monroe Council of the Arts Corporation. The name was changed to the Florida Keys Council of the Arts in 2001. Today the organization is the liaison among cultural organizations, all levels of government and the private sector in encouraging and promoting the arts throughout Monroe County. The council endeavors to make the arts a part of the fabric of daily life. From its inception through fiscal year end 2006, FKCA has awarded $433,916 in privately raised funds and grants to literary, visual and performing artists and cultural organizations. Add to that sum the Cultural Umbrella event funding, the South Florida Cultural Consortium Visual & Media Artists Fellowships and The Art in Public Places commissions, and the total distributed in the Keys cultural community through FKCA's efforts come to $2.5 million to date. The annual economic impact of the non-profit cultural community in the Keys is estimated at over $22 million. The Florida Keys Council of the Arts, a non-profit, 501 (c) (3) corporation in a public-private partnership with local county government since 1997 serves 76,329 local residents and three million visitors annually. A ten-member board of directors guides the council, assisted by three alternate directors, two directors Emeritus and twenty-five advisory board members.

Education
The Monroe County School District serves the entire county, as well as several private schools for primary and secondary education.

Florida Keys Community College is the primary college education provider with main campus in Key West, Florida. FKCC also operates two additional campuses in the Florida Keys; one in Marathon and another in Key Largo.

Government

Politics

Although Monroe County has voted mostly for the Democratic candidate since 1992, it is a competitive county in presidential elections; it was won by the Democratic Party by margins of 5% in 2008 and 0.5% in 2004 and 2012. Barack Obama was the first candidate for president to win a majority, 51.7%, of the vote since George H. W. Bush's national 7.7% victory in 1988. In 2016, Donald Trump became the first Republican to carry the county in almost three decades, winning a majority and winning it by an even larger margin than Obama had won it by in 2008. In 2020, he won it by a still wider margin.

Monroe County is politically divided by geography, with Key West voting reliably Democratic, Stock Island being politically variable, and the rest of the archipelago voting reliably Republican. The western part of Key West is more strongly Democratic than the eastern part of the island.

On July 17, 2014, a county court judge ruled the state's ban on same sex marriage unconstitutional, ordering the county clerk of court to issue marriage licenses on July 22, 2014.

Libraries
The Monroe County Public Library system serves residents of the Florida Keys in five locations: Key West, Big Pine, Marathon, Key Largo, and Islamorada.

The Monroe County Public Library provides various programs and services to the Monroe County community, including job finding tools. There is a program that preserves the history of the Keys for use by customers. In 2010 the library worked to digitize historical photographs of the Keys.

Annual visitors cards can be purchased for $30. The library provides access to PCs with internet and word processing capabilities. The library also provides free Wi-Fi for all.

The Monroe County Public Library is served by the Miami-Dade County subregional library of Florida Bureau of Braille and Talking Books Library.

Economy
54% of the people in the county work in the tourist industry. In 2016, tourism brought $2.7 billion to the county.

Communities

Cities
 Key West (1)
 Marathon (2)
 Key Colony Beach (3)
 Layton (4)

Village
 Islamorada (5)

Census-designated places
 Stock Island (a)
 Big Coppitt Key (b)
 Cudjoe Key (c)
 Big Pine Key (d)
 Duck Key (e)
 Tavernier (f)
 Key Largo (g)
 North Key Largo (h)

Other unincorporated areas
 Flamingo (i)
 Bay Point (j)
 Sugarloaf Shores (k)
 Marquesas Keys (l)
 Bahia Honda Key (m)
 Everglades (n)

Former communities
 Chevelier
 Craig
 Fort Jefferson
 Indian Key
 Perky
 Poinciana 
 Pigeon Key
 Pinecrest
 Snake Bight

See also

 National Register of Historic Places listings in Monroe County, Florida

References

External links

 

 
Florida counties
1823 establishments in Florida Territory
Populated places established in 1823
Florida Keys